Termitomycesphins A-H are neuritogenic cerebrosides isolated from the mushroom Termitomyces albuminosus.

External links
 Termitomycesphins G and H, additional cerebrosides from the edible Chinese mushroom Termitomyces albuminosus

Glycolipids
Lyophyllaceae